Modin may refer to:

People
 Fredrik Modin (born 1974), ice hockey player
 Yuri Modin (1922–2007), secret agent

Places
 Modi'in-Maccabim-Re'ut, town in Israel referred to in the Bible as 'Modin'.

See also
 Movimiento por la Dignidad y la Independencia, former Argentine political party, shortened as "MODIN"
 Camp Modin